Blasting and Bombardiering is the autobiography of the English painter, novelist, and satirist Percy Wyndham Lewis.  It was published in 1937.  It was in this work that Lewis first identified the critically oft-mentioned "Men of 1914" group of himself, Ezra Pound, T. S. Eliot, and James Joyce.

References 

1937 non-fiction books
Books by Wyndham Lewis
British autobiographies